Abdal-Latif Mirza (c. 1420 – 9 May 1450) was the great-grandson of Central Asian emperor Timur. He was the third son of Ulugh Beg, Timurid ruler of Transoxiana (modern Uzbekistan, Tajikistan and parts of Turkmenistan, Kyrgyzstan and Kazakhstan).

Early years
Having been given the governorship of Balkh, Abdal-Latif Mirza served under his father. During the succession struggle that followed the death of Shah Rukh, he occupied Herat, although after Ulugh Beg left the city at the end of 1448 it was conquered by Abul-Qasim Babur Mirza.

Abdal-Latif Mirza did not remain loyal to his father. Angry over the fact that he was to be passed over in the transfer of rule of Samarkand, he revolted while Ulugh Beg was marching to retake Khorasan. He defeated his father at Dimashq, near Samarkand, in the fall of 1449.

Ulugh Beg later decided to surrender himself, and Abdal-Latif Mirza granted him permission to take a pilgrimage to Mecca, but while Ulugh Beg was on his way he was murdered by his son on the latter's order.

This earned Abdal-Latif Mirza the infamous nickname Padar-kush, or Pedar-kush (from Persian "killer of his father، پدر کش"). A few days later he also had his brother 'Abd al-'Aziz killed.

Death
In this manner he became ruler of Transoxiana. A somewhat pious person, he gained the support of the local religious groups, but this did not save him from a conspiracy hatched against him by the amirs. His reign lasted for only six months. He was succeeded by his cousin Abdullah Mirza.

Personal life
Consort
Shah Sultan Agha, daughter of Muhammad Musharaf son of Hamid, a Mughal Amir;

Sons
Abul Razaq Mirza - with Shah Sultan Agha;
Ahmad Mirza - with Shah Sultan Agha;
Mahmud Mirza - with Shah Sultan Agha;
Juki Mirza - with Shah Sultan Agha;
Muhammad Baqir Mirza - with Shah Sultan Agha;

Daughter
Qatak Sultan Begum - with Shah Sultan Agha;

1420s births
1450 deaths
Timurid monarchs
People from Herat